is a mountain in the Chichibu Tama Kai National Park near Tokyo, Japan. On the mountain is a Shinto shrine where practices such as Futomani divination take place.

The trip from Tokyo's Shinjuku Station to Mitake Station on the Ōme Line takes about 95 minutes. 

A shuttle bus, located 50 meters to the left of Mitake Station, travels to Takimoto village every half-hour between 07:30 to 18:00. From Takimoto village, the Mitake-Tozan Railway cable car operates every half-hour between 07:30 to 18:30 and leads to Mitakesan village at its top. Mitake summit and the  can then be reached by trail—approximately 1000 meters. Hikers heading to Mount Odake (Tokyo) often start here.

Many hikers access the mountain via Kori Station (two stops past Mitake Station from Ome).  There is a hiking trail that takes approximately two and half hours to reach the summit, which passes Otsukayama (920 metres).

There is also a festival every year on May 8.

Mountains of Tokyo
Western Tokyo